Lygomusotima stria is a moth in the family Crambidae. It was described by Maria Alma Solis and Shen-Horn Yen in 2004. It is found from Singapore and Thailand to Pulo Laut (an island near Borneo).

The length of the forewings is 5–7.1 mm

The larvae feed on Lygodium microphyllum. Young larvae skeletonize the leaves of their host plant, while older larvae consume entire leaves. Pupation takes place on the host plant.

Etymology
The species name is derived from the striae in the female ductus bursae.

References

Moths described in 2004
Musotiminae